Cyllandus or Kyllandos was a city  of ancient Caria mentioned by Stephanus of Byzantium. It was a polis (city-state) and a member of the Delian League.
 
Its site is located near Elmalı, Asiatic Turkey.

References

Populated places in ancient Caria
Former populated places in Turkey
Greek city-states
Members of the Delian League
Ula District
History of Muğla Province